Ethiopia is called the water tower of Africa due to its combination of mountainous areas with a comparatively large share of water resources in Africa. Only a fraction of this potential has been harnessed so far, 1% at the beginning of the 21st century. In order to become the powerhouse of Africa, Ethiopia is actively exploiting its water resources by building dams, reservoirs, irrigation and diversion canals and hydropower stations. The benefits of the dams are not only limited to hydropower. Many dams are multi-purpose dams that are also designed to provide water for irrigation, drinking water and flood control. However, hydropower is expected to be the main benefit of the dams.

List of dams and reservoirs 

List with an emphasis on construction-related informations.

Weighing the benefits and costs of large dams is far from easy. The following sections describe the impacts of the dams in more detail as objectively as possible, in order to provide a basis for such an assessment by the reader. They have to be compared with the planned use, see above.

Issues 
The construction of large dams entails many tangible and intangible costs. The financial cost itself is already substantial. Resettlement adds to the social costs of the dams. Sedimentation from unchecked erosion in the upper watershed of rivers reduces the lifespan of reservoirs. Environmental costs are imposed on communities living downstream of the dams in Ethiopia. And neighboring countries, in particularly Egypt, see their historical water rights affected and threaten to take action against the dams. The almost exclusive reliance on hydropower makes electricity generation vulnerable to droughts, which may be exacerbated by climate change. Earthquakes can also endanger the dams and associated tunnels. There were a total of 16 recorded earthquakes of magnitude 6.5 and higher in Ethiopia's seismic active areas in the 20th century. Last but not least, the dams are built in an environment of poor governance: Most contracts have been awarded without competitive bidding, raising the suspicion of corruption. The above concerns have hampered access to financing from international financial institutions, slowing down the dam building program.

Financial costs 

The financial costs of large dams in Ethiopia that have been completed after 2009 and were scheduled to be completed until 2014 is estimated at about US$11 billion, or about one third of Ethiopia's annual GDP. This does not include the cost to build transmission lines and to expand the distribution grid.

Given very low electricity tariffs in Ethiopia, the dams are not likely to generate a large financial rate of return, except if generation is subsidized by the government which itself is cash-strapped. Since many dams will be financed through loans, the heavy investment program – to the extent it is not being financed directly by the government outside the balance sheet of the national power utility EEPCo – could jeopardize the financial health of EEPCo. If the utility should become bankrupt, loan guarantees from the Ethiopian government would be called, thus imposing a potentially high financial cost on the government in addition to the investment subsidies from the government for the construction of the dams. Furthermore, the Central Bank of Ethiopia has issued bonds to finance the construction of the Grand Ethiopian Renaissance Dam, the largest of all dams in Ethiopia. These subsidies have a high opportunity cost, since the scarce government funds are not available for other investments in education, health, agriculture or forestry.

Delays and technical challenges 

Large dam projects are prone to delays. The dams built in Ethiopia are no exception to the rule and all have been delayed by at least one year. A complex geology has been one of the reasons for the delays, leading to landslides and tunnel collapses. The Gibe II dam has been affected by such problems even after its completion, when a tunnel collapsed and put the hydropower plant out of service for several months. The grand Ethiopian renaissance dam was delayed as well, because of upgrading the power from 5250 watt to 6000 watt, budget problems and dispute with government of Egypt.

Resettlement 

There has been no estimate of the overall number of people that would have to be resettled to make room for dams and reservoirs in Ethiopia. Since most dams are to be built in narrow valleys, the areas to be inundated are not as large as, for example, in the case of Lake Nasser in Egypt. Lake Nasser covers an area of more than 5,000 km2 and displaced more than 60,000 people. Resettlement at Gibe I has been implemented satisfactorily according to the World Bank, in compliance with the institutions’ resettlement policies. However, the NGO International Rivers conducted a survey of resettled families finding that many of the 5,000 resettled people complain about the living conditions at the resettlement sites.

Siltation 

Ethiopia's rivers carry a high silt content, due to heavy erosion which is accelerated by deforestation and inappropriate agricultural practices on steep mountain slopes. The reservoir of one of Ethiopia's oldest large dams, the Awash dam commissioned in 1966, is close to reaching the end of its useful life due to siltation. While most of the newly constructed dams are much larger than the Awash dam and thus have a longer lifetime, they will also ultimately silt up. Estimates of the lifetime of the dams are not available. There have been few efforts to manage the watersheds upstream of the new dams through terracing or reforestation.

Droughts 

Hydropower generation is vulnerable to droughts. The first large hydropower plant in Ethiopia, the Tekeze dam, was out of production for most of its first year after commissioning because of drought. The distribution of dams over two different river basins reduces somewhat the risk of drought, which nevertheless remains substantial. The Ethiopian government has awarded contracts for wind parks in 2010. However, their size is small compared to the hydropower plants and more than 95% of the future installed capacity in Ethiopia is from hydropower, despite a large potential for wind, solar and geothermal power.

Transboundary impacts 

Almost all of the dams planned by Ethiopia are either located in the Nile River basin or on the Omo River. Both rivers are shared with Ethiopia's neighbors and for none of them an international water sharing agreement exists. Ethiopia participates in the Nile Basin Initiative, a forum for dialogue with the other Nile riparians.

While hydropower does not consume water, the filling (impoundment) of reservoirs reduces the water flow once. In addition, evaporation from the reservoir surfaces constitutes a permanent loss of water from the river. Irrigation also consumes water that is not available any more for downstream uses.

The Blue Nile and the Atbara both drain to the main Nile River. Ethiopia has no agreement with Egypt or Sudan about the sharing of the river's water. Egypt says that its historic water rights would be violated by dams in Ethiopia and that its water security would be affected.  Egypt and Sudan concluded a water sharing treaty in 1959. The agreement does not consider the water rights of other Nile riparian states. It has never been recognized by Ethiopia. The three countries did however sign the Declaration of Principles in 2015 which makes no reference to historical treaties and encourages cooperation and equitable use of Nile waters. It is not known exactly to what extent dams in Ethiopia would reduce the flow of water to Sudan and Ethiopia. Assuming an evaporation rate of 1 meter per year, an irrigated area of 200,000 hectares and a combined reservoir area of 1,000 km2, the flow of the Nile could be reduced by 3 billion cubic meters per year, equivalent to about 5 percent of the current allocation of Egypt under the 1959 agreement.

The Omo River flows to Lake Turkana in Kenya. Kenya has not expressed concerns about downstream impacts on Lake Turkana, although NGOs have done so.

Governance 

Contracts to build the first dams in Ethiopia constructed under the government of Meles Zenawi, who came to power in 1991, have been awarded after competitive bidding. This is the case of the Gilgel Gibe I dam built by the Italian firm Salini under World Bank financing and the Tekeze dam built by the Chinese firm CWHEC with Chinese financing. Both contracts were awarded in the 1990s. However, soon afterwards the Ethiopian government changed its policy and decided to award contracts directly without competitive bidding. Since then, all construction contracts for dams and associated infrastructure have been awarded directly, giving rise to the suspicion of corruption. Three large contracts have been awarded directly to one firm, Salini Costruttori of Italy. Five more large contracts have been awarded to two Chinese firms.

The NGO International Rivers reports that “conversations with civil society groups in Ethiopia indicate that questioning the government’s energy sector plans is highly risky, and there are legitimate concerns of government persecution. Because of this political climate, no groups are actively pursuing the issues surrounding hydropower dams, nor publicly raising concerns about the risks. In this situation, extremely limited and inadequate public consultation has been organized” during the implementation of major dams.

See also

 Energy in Ethiopia
 Water politics in the Nile Basin
 Water supply and sanitation in Ethiopia

References 

Reservoirs in Ethiopia
Dams in Ethiopia
Ethiopia
Dams and reservoirs